National Highway 116A, commonly referred to as NH 116A is a national highway in India. It is a secondary route of National Highway 16.  NH-116A runs in the state of West Bengal in India.

Route 
NH116A connects Panskura (Mechogram), Daspur, Bandar, Gourhati, Arambagh, Uchalan, Sehara Bazar, Bardhaman, Karjana,Rampur,  Mangalkot, Khargram, Nagar, Sherpur Panchgram and Moregram in the state of West Bengal.

Junctions  

  Terminal near Kharagpur.
  near Bardhaman
  Terminal near Moregram.

See also 
 List of National Highways in India
 List of National Highways in India by state

References 

4.^https://en.m.wikipedia.org/wiki/Nagar,_Murshidabad

External links 

 NH 116A on OpenStreetMap

National highways in India
National Highways in West Bengal